Irma P. McClaurin is an American poet, anthropologist, academic, and leadership consultant.
She was the first female president of Shaw University, and is the author or editor of several books on topics including the culture of Belize, black feminism, African-American history,
and her own poetry.

Education and career
McClaurin is African-American, and grew up in Chicago. She majored in American Studies at Grinnell College, graduating in 1973,
and earned a Master of Fine Arts in English in 1976 from the University of Massachusetts Amherst,
as part of the first generation in her family to earn college degrees.
As a full-time mother, she returned to the University of Massachusetts Amherst for additional graduate study, earning a Ph.D. in Anthropology in 1993.
She became a faculty member at the University of Florida,
and also served as the editor of the journal Transforming Anthropology from 1996 to 2002.

After working as an administrator at Fisk University,
she was named the Mott Distinguished Chair in Women’s Studies at Bennett College in 2004, where she founded the Africana Women’s Studies Program.
She was a program officer at the Ford Foundation from 2005 to 2007.
She founded the Urban Research and Outreach-Engagement Center at the University of Minnesota in 2007, and became its executive director. From 2010 to 2011 she was president of Shaw University, serving as its first female president and guiding the university through a year in which it suffered major damage from a tornado.

After stepping down from Shaw, she became a senior faculty member at the Federal Executive Institute and then the chief diversity officer of Teach For America.

Recognition
McClaurin won the Gwendolyn Brooks Literary Award for Poetry in 1975.
In 2015, the Black Press of America named a column by McClaurin, "A Black mother weeps for America: Stop killing our Black sons!", as the best in the country for that year.
In 2016, the University of Massachusetts Amherst recognized McClaurin as a distinguished alumna. In 2017, the National Women's Studies Association gave her a special award for "her contributions to the growth and vitality of NWSA" in her work at the Ford Foundation, where she oversaw grants that led to dramatic changes in the association.

Books
McClaurin is the author or editor of:
Black Chicago (Amuru Rannick Press, 1971)
Song in the Night (Pearl Press, 1974)
Pearl's Song: Poems (Lotus Press, 1988) 
Women of Belize: Gender and Change in Central America (Rutgers University Press, 1996)  
Black Feminist Anthropology: Theory, Politics, Praxis, and Poetics (edited, Rutgers University Press, 2001)  
The Civil Rights Movement (with Virginia Schomp, Drama of African-American History, Marshall Cavendish Benchmark, 2008)  
Facing the Future (with Virginia Schomp, Drama of African-American History, Marshall Cavendish Benchmark, 2008)

References

External links
Home page

American anthropologists
African-American social scientists
American academic administrators
Living people
Year of birth missing (living people)
Grinnell College alumni
University of Massachusetts Amherst College of Social and Behavioral Sciences alumni
University of Florida faculty
Bennett College faculty
University of Minnesota faculty
Shaw University faculty
Heads of universities and colleges in the United States
African-American women academics
American women academics
African-American academics
Women heads of universities and colleges